Brigadoon is a musical with a book and lyrics by Alan Jay Lerner, and music by Frederick Loewe. The song "Almost Like Being in Love", from the musical, has become a standard. It features two American tourists who stumble upon Brigadoon, a mysterious Scottish village that appears for only one day every 100 years. Tommy, one of the tourists, falls in love with Fiona, a young woman from Brigadoon.

The original production opened at the Ziegfeld Theatre on Broadway in 1947 and ran for 581 performances. It starred David Brooks,  Marion Bell, Pamela Britton, and Lee Sullivan. In 1949, Brigadoon opened at Her Majesty's Theatre in the West End and ran for 685 performances; many revivals have followed. A 1954 film version starred Gene Kelly and Cyd Charisse, and a 1966 television version starred Robert Goulet and Peter Falk.

Background
Lyricist and book writer Alan Jay Lerner and composer Frederick Loewe had previously collaborated on three musicals; the first, Life of the Party, closed during pre-Broadway tryouts, and the second and third, What's Up? and The Day Before Spring, had met with moderate success. Inspired by Rodgers and Hammerstein's successful collaborations Oklahoma! and Carousel, they created Brigadoon, about a magical village in the Scottish highlands.

Like Oklahoma! and Carousel, Brigadoon included a serious love story as the main plot and a lighter romance as subplot. Thematically, the musical depicted the contrast between empty city life and the warmth and simplicity of the country, focusing on a theme of love transcending time. Agnes de Mille, who had previously choreographed Oklahoma! and Carousel, was hired as choreographer, and her work for Brigadoon incorporated elements of traditional Scottish folk dance: a traditional sword dance, a chase scene, and a funeral dance.

Though Lerner and Loewe originally took Brigadoon to producer Billy Rose, Cheryl Crawford was the producer who actually brought Brigadoon to Broadway. Lerner explained the change in producer by saying: "The contract which [Billy Rose] wished us to sign negated Abraham Lincoln's Emancipation Proclamation that freed the slaves." Under Loewe's guidance, Ted Royal received a sole orchestrator credit for his work on the original production. His atmospheric arrangements have been frequently used for the revivals.

Though the Highland village of Brigadoon is fictional, it is named after the (Lowland) Brig o' Doon, a bridge located south of Alloway, Ayrshire, Scotland, which is the setting for the final verse of Robert Burns's poem "Tam o' Shanter".

The New York Times'''s theater critic George Jean Nathan wrote that Lerner's book was based on a German story, published in 1860 by Friedrich Gerstäcker, later translated by Charles Brandon Schaeffer, about the mythical village of Germelshausen that fell under a magic curse.Graeme Harper, "Meeting the Man from Planet X", in Gary D. Rhodes, ed., Edgar G. Ulmer - Detour on Poverty Row (Lexington Books, 2008), p. 228. However, Lerner denied that he had based the book on an older story, and, in an explanation published in The New York Times, stated that he did not learn of the existence of the Germelshausen story until after he had completed the first draft of Brigadoon. Lerner said that in his subsequent research, he found many other legends of disappearing towns in various countries' folklore, and he pronounced their similarities "unconscious coincidence".

Plot
Act I
New Yorkers Tommy Albright and Jeff Douglas have travelled to the Scottish Highlands on a game-hunting vacation, but they get lost on their first night out. They begin to hear music ("Brigadoon") coming from a nearby village that does not appear on their map of the area. They head over there to get directions back to their inn and find a fair in progress ("McConnachy Square"), with villagers dressed in traditional Scottish tartan. Andrew MacLaren and his daughters arrive at the fair to purchase supplies for younger daughter Jean's wedding to Charlie Dalrymple. Archie Beaton's son Harry madly loves Jean and is depressed at the thought of her marrying another, unable to find comfort in Maggie Anderson's devotion to him. One of the girls asks Jean's older sister Fiona when she'll marry, and Fiona answers she's waiting for the right person ("Waitin' For My Dearie").

Tommy and Jeff wander into the village and ask where they are; Archie informs them that they are in "Brigadoon". Fiona invites the wanderers to have a meal and rest at the MacLaren home. Flirtatious dairymaid Meg Brockie immediately falls for Jeff and leads him off. Charlie Dalrymple appears, rejoicing in his impending nuptials. He shares a drink with Tommy, toasting to a Mr. Forsythe whom he thanks for "postponing the miracle". When Tommy asks what that means, Fiona shushes him and leads him away as Charlie celebrates the end of his bachelorhood ("Go Home with Bonnie Jean"). Tommy tells Fiona that he has a fiancée, Jane, in New York, but he's in no hurry to marry her, and Fiona reveals that she likes Tommy very much. Tommy insists on accompanying Fiona to gather heather for the wedding ("The Heather on the Hill"). Meanwhile, Meg takes Jeff to a place in the forest with a shack and a cot. She tells him she's "highly attracted" to him, but he spurns her advances, wanting only to sleep. She reflects on her 'eventful' love life ("The Love of My Life").

At the MacLarens', Jean's friends help her pack her things to move into Charlie's home ("Jeannie's Packin' Up"). Charlie arrives to sign the MacLarens' family Bible. He wants to see Jean; told that it's bad luck to see her on the wedding day, he begs for her to come out anyway ("Come to Me, Bend to Me"). Tommy and Fiona return with a basket full of heather, and Fiona goes upstairs to help Jean dress for the wedding. Jeff arrives wearing a pair of Highland trews (trousers); apparently his own pants have been damaged on a "thistle". Jeff finds that Tommy is so happy that he can barely contain it ("Almost Like Being in Love"). Tommy notices that all the events listed in the family Bible, including Jean's wedding, are listed as if they had happened 200 years earlier. When he asks Fiona about this, she sends him to the schoolmaster, Mr. Lundie.

Fiona, Tommy, and Jeff arrive at Mr. Lundie's home, where he relates a story that the two New Yorkers can hardly believe: to protect Brigadoon from being changed by the outside world, 200 years ago the local minister prayed to God to have Brigadoon disappear, only to reappear for one day every 100 years. All citizens of Brigadoon are forbidden to leave the town, or it will disappear forever. Tommy asks hypothetically if an outsider could be permitted to stay. Mr. Lundie replies, "A stranger can stay if he loves someone here – not jus' Brigadoon, mind ye, but someone in Brigadoon – enough to want to give up everythin' an' stay with that one person. Which is how it should be. 'Cause after all, lad, if ye love someone deeply, anythin' is possible."

The group leaves to go to the wedding, which opens with the clans coming in from the hills. Mr. Lundie marries Charlie and Jean, and they perform a traditional celebratory wedding dance. Sword dancers appear, led by Harry, and they perform an elaborate dance over their weapons. All the town joins in the dance, but it abruptly halts when Jean screams as Harry tries to kiss her. In anguish over Jean's wedding, he announces that he's leaving the town (which would end the miracle, causing Brigadoon to disappear forever into the Highland mists) and sprints away.

Act II
The men of the town, including Tommy and a reluctant Jeff, frantically try to find Harry before he can depart the town ("The Chase"). Suddenly an agonized scream is heard. Harry, who appears to have fallen on a rock and crushed his skull, is found dead by the other men. Deciding not to tell the rest of the town until the next morning, the men carry Harry's body away. Fiona and her father arrive to see if everything is all right. As Mr. MacLaren leaves, Tommy sees Fiona, and they embrace. She reveals her love for him, and he tells her he believes he feels the same way ("There But For You Go I"). Fiona reminds him that the end of the day is near, and Tommy tells her he wants to stay in Brigadoon with her. They go to find Mr. Lundie.

Meanwhile, in the village, Meg tells about the day her parents were drunkenly married ("My Mother's Wedding Day"), and the townsfolk dance until the sound of Highland pipes pierces the air. The gaiety is interrupted as Archie Beaton enters carrying Harry's body, led by the pipers playing a lament. Maggie, who loved Harry, performs a funeral dance for her unrequited love. The men of Brigadoon help Archie carry his son to the burial place.

Tommy finds Jeff and announces his intention to stay. Jeff thinks the idea is absurd and argues with Tommy until he has convinced him that Brigadoon is only a dream. Jeff also reveals that he tripped Harry and accidentally killed him. Fiona and Mr. Lundie arrive, and Tommy, shaken by Jeff's confession, tells Fiona that he loves her, but he can't stay; he still has doubts ("From This Day On"). Fiona tells Tommy, as she fades away into darkness, that she will love him forever.

Four months later, Jeff is drinking heavily at a hotel bar in New York. Tommy, who has been living on a farm in New Hampshire, enters and greets Jeff, but is still in love with Fiona and cannot stop thinking about her. His fiancée Jane Ashton, a beautiful socialite, talks to him about their impending wedding, but everything she says causes him to hear Fiona's voice and dream of Brigadoon ("Come to Me, Bend to Me" (reprise) and "Heather on the Hill" (reprise)). Tommy tells Jane that he cannot marry her, and she argues with him, but he continues to daydream about his true love ("Go Home With Bonnie Jean" (reprise) and "From This Day On" (reprise)). Jane leaves, and Tommy tells Jeff that he wants to return to Scotland, although he knows the village will not be there.

The pair return to the spot where they found Brigadoon and, as they expected, see nothing there.  Just as they turn to leave, they hear the music again ("Brigadoon"), and Mr. Lundie appears and says, "My my! You must really love her. You woke me up!" Tommy waves goodbye to Jeff and disappears with Mr. Lundie into the Highland mist to be reunited with Fiona.

Musical numbers

Act I
Introduction
Prologue (Once in the Highlands) – Ensemble
Brigadoon – Ensemble
 Vendors' Calls – Ensemble
Down on MacConnachy Square – Ensemble
Waitin' for My Dearie – Fiona and Girls
I'll Go Home with Bonnie Jean – Charlie and Ensemble
Dance – Charlie and Ensemble
The Heather on the Hill – Tommy and Fiona
Rain Exorcism †
The Love of My Life – Meg Brockie
Jeannie's Packin' Up – Girls
Come to Me, Bend to Me – Charlie
Dance – Jean and Girls
Almost Like Being in Love – Tommy and Fiona 
Bible Scene – Tommy and Jeff
Entrance of the Clans/Wedding Ceremony ‡ Ensemble
Wedding Dance/The Sword Dance and Reel ‡ Harry and Ensemble

Act II
The Chase – Ensemble
There But for You Go I – Tommy
Steps Stately †
Drunken Reel †
Glen Scene Opening/My Mother's Wedding Day  – Meg and Ensemble
Dance – Ensemble
Funeral (Traditional Piobrochead) – Maggie
From This Day On – Tommy and Fiona
Farewell Music
Reprises: Come to Me, Bend to Me / The Heather on the Hill / I'll Go Home with Bonnie Jean / From This Day On / Down on MacConnachy Square
Finale (Brigadoon) – Ensemble

† Added in 1980 revival
‡ Moved to Act II in 1980 revival

Productions
The show opened in Philadelphia pre-Broadway (tryout) at the Forrest Theatre on February 24, 1947, for two weeks.  The original Broadway production, directed by Robert Lewis and choreographed by Agnes de Mille, opened March 13, 1947, at the Ziegfeld Theatre, where it ran for 581 performances  It starred David Brooks as Tommy, George Keane as Jeff, Marion Bell as Fiona, Lee Sullivan as Charlie, Virginia Bosler as Jeannie, James Mitchell as Harry, and Pamela Britton as Meg. The concertmistress of the orchestra was noted American violinist Joan Field. De Mille won the Tony Award for Best Choreography, and Bell and Mitchell won the Theatre World Award. The show returned to Philadelphia post-Broadway at the Shubert Theatre on Monday, September 6, 1948, for two weeks. The production then enjoyed an extended North American tour.

The musical's original West End production opened on April 14, 1949, at Her Majesty's Theatre, running for 685 performances. It starred Philip Hanna as Tommy, Patricia Hughes as Fiona, James Jamieson as Harry, and Noele Gordon as Meg. Bruce Trent took the leading role in 1949 at His Majesty's Theatre. Two telegrams, one from impresario Emile Littler and another where the signature is difficult to identify, to Bruce Trent are dated 24 February 1949.

David Brooks reprised his role of Tommy in the Summertime Light Opera's production in Houston, Texas in 1950, with Gregg Juarez as Jeff and Dorothy MacNeil of the New York City Opera as Fiona.  Stage direction was by John Brownlee, principal baritone of the Metropolitan Opera, and the musical director and conductor was Frederick Fennell of the Rochester Eastman Kodak Symphony.

The musical was revived at New York City Center in May 1950. It was revived on Broadway seven years later, directed by George H. Englund and choreographed by De Mille, opening on April 15, 1957, at the Adelphi Theatre, where it ran for 24 performances. The cast included David Atkinson, Helen Gallagher, Patricia Birch, and Marilyn Cooper. Another Broadway revival, directed by John Fearnley and choreographed by De Mille, opened on January 30, 1963, at New York City Center, where it ran for 16 performances. The cast included Peter Palmer, Russell Nype, Sally Ann Howes, and Edward Villella. It was Tony-nominated for Best Actress in a Musical (Howes), Best Direction of a Musical, and Best Conductor and Musical Director.

The next Broadway revival, directed by Vivian Matalon and choreographed by De Mille, opened on October 16, 1980, at the Majestic Theatre, where it ran for 133 performances and eight previews. The cast included Meg Bussert, Martin Vidnovic, and John Curry. Vidnovic received Tony and Drama Desk Award nominations, Bussert earned a Tony nomination and won the Theatre World Award, and the production was Tony-nominated for Best Reproduction.

New York City Opera staged the musical in 1986 and 1991.

The musical was revived in the West End at the Victoria Palace Theatre, opening on October 25, 1988, and closing August 5, 1989, starring Robert Meadmore (Tommy), Jacinta Mulcahy, and Lesley Mackie. The director was Roger Redfarn and de Mille's dances were rechoreographed by Tommy Shaw. The Times reviewer noted that those dances were "the main source of the magic."Wardle, Irving.  "'Brigadoon'; Victoria Palace; Theatre", The Times (London), October 27, 1988, no page number (Issue 63223)

In 2014, a major revival was staged at the Goodman Theater in Chicago.  Directed and choreographed by Rachel Rockwell, with a revised book by Brian Hill, Charles Isherwood of The New York Times called the production "a first-class revival that boasts an infectious buoyancy of spirit and a welcome absence of postmodern flourishes." This version with the revised book by Hill was staged at the Shaw Festival in 2019.

The 2017 Melbourne production by The Production Company at the State Theatre, with Rohan Browne, Genevive Kingsford and Nancye Hayes and directed by Jason Langley, updated the setting of the world outside Brigadoon to contemporary times.

A staged concert was presented at New York City Center from November 15 to 19, 2017, with Stephanie J. Block as Meg Brockie, Aasif Mandvi as Jeff Douglas, Kelli O'Hara as Fiona and Patrick Wilson as Tommy Albright.  It was directed and choreographed by Christopher Wheeldon.  Reviews for this production were uniformly positive.

Characters and original cast

Adaptations

Film

A Cinemascope film version of Brigadoon, directed by Vincente Minnelli, was released by MGM in 1954 with Gene Kelly, Van Johnson, and Cyd Charisse in leading roles.

Television
On October 15, 1966, a television film version was broadcast on ABC. This version won five Primetime Emmy Awards.

The 1966 television version used a modernized, abbreviated script that accommodated much more of the score than the 1954 film version had, though the entire production ran only ninety minutes with commercials. "My Mother's Wedding Day" was restored to this version, though "Once in the Highlands", "Jeannie's Packin' Up", and "The Love of My Life" were still absent. In this version, Tommy and Jeff were participating in an auto race when their car stalled just outside Brigadoon.

The TV film starred Robert Goulet as Tommy, Peter Falk as Jeff, and Sally Ann Howes as Fiona.  Also appearing were Finlay Currie, in one of his last roles, as Mr. Lundie, Edward Villella as Harry Beaton, and Marlyn Mason as Meg.  The TV film was directed by Fielder Cook.

The 1966 telecast of Brigadoon has not been shown since its 1968 rebroadcast, nor has it ever been released on videocassette or DVD.  It may, however, be viewed on the Internet Archive and on YouTube. In addition, the soundtrack of this TV adaptation was released by Columbia Records (under its "Columbia Special Products" banner) on the same year as the original broadcast.

 Schmigadoon! Schmigadoon! is a musical comedy television series which premiered on Apple TV+ on July 16, 2021. The series' title and premise is a modern-day take on Brigadoon's plot.

ReceptionBrigadoon opened to very positive reviews with praise for its originality, and for integration of song and story, though some critics had minor points of criticism.

Brooks Atkinson of The New York Times praised the musical's integration, saying: "For once, the modest label 'musical play' has a precise meaning. For it is impossible to say where the music and dancing leave off and the story begins. Under Bob Lewis's direction all the arts of the theatre have been woven into a singing pattern of enchantment". Atkinson also emphasized Agnes de Mille's contributions as choreographer: "Some of the dances are merely illustrations for the music. One or two of them are conventional, if lovely, maiden round dances. But some of them, like the desperate chase in the forest, are fiercely dramatic. The funeral dance to the dour tune of bagpipes brings the footstep of doom into the forest. And the sword dance, done magnificently by James Mitchell, is tremendously exciting with its stylization of primitive ideas".

Robert Coleman of the New York Daily Mirror said: "It took courage to produce Brigadoon, an unconventional musical show of marked originality... [that] still manages to pack a tartan full of popular appeal". In the New York Herald Tribune, Howard Barnes pronounced Brigadoon: "A bonny thing for Broadway, a scintillating song and dance fantasy that has given theatregoers reason to toss tamoshanters in air". Robert Garland of the New York Journal American particularly praised Pamela Britton as Meg Brockie: "Pamela Britton escaped from both M.G.M. and Frank Sinatra in time to be tough as a Scottish temptress, and rough as a singer of raffish songs". He also opined that famed Russian choreographer George Balanchine should watch Brigadoon to learn how a musical should be choreographed. Ward Morehouse of The New York Sun deemed it "A stunning show", saying: "It has whimsy, beguiling music, exciting dancing – and it has a book.... Brigadoon is by far the best musical play the season has produced, and it is certainly one of the best within my entire play-going experience".

John Chapman of the Daily News enjoyed the dances but thought there were too many and that they interrupted the story: "Just when I get pleasantly steamed up about the love of Mr. Brooks and Miss Bell, I don't want to be cooled off by watching a herd of gazelles from Chorus Equity running around". He particularly praised William Hansen's performance as Mr. Lundie, declaring that he "is so irresistibly able to persuade you that if there isn't a village named Brigadoon, there ought to be".

Louis Kronenberger of PM said: "the musical fantasy [Brigadoon] not only has charm; it shows a good deal of independence... its charm must lie less in any story it tells than in the general mood it creates; and it has created that mood by fusing a number of theatre elements as densely as possible". Kronenberger, however, disliked the ending, calling it "an outright blunder" done "in the corniest Broadway fashion".

Richard Watts Jr. of the New York Post wrote: "I have seen other musical comedies that I enjoyed more, but few for which I have a deeper admiration". He opined that Lerner and Loewe's score for The Day Before Spring the previous year was better than theirs for Brigadoon, explaining that: "If my first emotion last night was admiration rather than sheer enjoyment, it was because the proceedings seemed to me more marked by taste and style than by emotional warmth in book and music, but there is no denying that the authors have matured as theatrical craftsmen".

Recordings
The following list of recordings is based on John Kenrick's discography for the site Musicals 101.

1947 Original Broadway cast recording (incomplete, due to recording limitations of the period; some lyrics were censored)
1954 Original motion picture soundtrack (originally incomplete, but re-released on CD with deleted songs, alternate takes, and undubbed vocals)
1957 studio cast recording (starring Shirley Jones and Jack Cassidy, with Frank Porretta and Susan Johnson).
1959 studio cast recording (starring Robert Merrill, Jan Peerce, and Jane Powell)
1966 Television cast recording (starring Sally Ann Howes, Robert Goulet, and Peter Falk)
1988 London revival cast recording (starring Robert Meadmore; some character names and dates were altered to make the show more historically accurate)
1991 Studio cast recording (starring Rebecca Luker and Brent Barrett, Judy Kaye, and Gregory Jbara)
2017 New York City Center recording (starring Kelli O'Hara and Patrick Wilson)

In media
 Brigadoon is mentioned in the 1985 song "The Whole of the Moon" by Scottish band The Waterboys.
 In the Star Trek: Lower Decks'' episode "The Stars at Night", a character refers to a planet that phases in and out of normal spacetime at a regular interval as "one of those Brigadoon-type planets."

References

Sources

External links

Brigadoon (original 1949 West End production) at the Guide to Musical Theatre

Brigadoon (1966 television production) at Internet Archive

Broadway musicals
1947 musicals
Fictional populated places in Scotland
Fantasy theatre
Plays set in Scotland
Musicals by Alan Jay Lerner
Musicals by Frederick Loewe
Original musicals
Tony Award-winning musicals